Vaughn Orrin Greenwood (January 19, 1944 – December 18, 2020) was an American serial killer, known in the press as the Skid Row Slasher.

Crimes
The first attacks occurred when Greenwood killed two transients in November 1964.  A ten-year gap period between murders occurred due to Greenwood being convicted and sentenced due to a knifing assault in Chicago in 1966.  He spent five and a half years in jail for this conviction before returning to California.  Greenwood continued his murder spree in December 1974 and killed nine victims between December 1974 and February 1975.

Greenwood was convicted of nine counts of murder, including eight of the "Skid Row Slasher" killings in Southern California. The "Slasher" victims had their throats cut from ear to ear. There was evidence that the killer drank the blood of the victims.  Greenwood left cups of blood and rings of salt around the corpses.  The items left around the bodies have caused some to believe the murders to be linked to Satanism.  This is disputed by K.V. Lanning.

On 19 January 1977, Greenwood was sentenced to life imprisonment.

Victims
These are the Skid Row Slasher's known victims in chronological order of attack:

See also 
 List of serial killers in the United States
 List of serial killers by number of victims

References

1944 births
1964 murders in the United States
2020 deaths
20th-century African-American people
20th-century American criminals
African-American people
American male criminals
American people convicted of assault
American people convicted of attempted murder
American people convicted of murder
American prisoners sentenced to life imprisonment
American serial killers
Criminals from Los Angeles
Criminals from Pennsylvania
Male serial killers
People convicted of murder by California
Prisoners sentenced to life imprisonment by California
Serial killers who died in prison custody
Vampirism (crime)
Violence against men in North America